"Perchance to Dream" is a phrase from the "To be, or not to be" soliloquy spoken by Shakespeare's Hamlet. The words have been used as a title for:

Literature
Perchance to Dream, a 1935 novel by Mary Lutyens
Perchance to Dream (novel), a 1991 Philip Marlowe novel by Robert B. Parker
"Perchance to Dream", an essay by Jonathan Franzen, later retitled "Why Bother?"

Music
"Perchance to Dream", track 2 from Something of Time by Nightnoise
"Perchance to Dream", track 20 from Halo Original Soundtrack
"Perchance to Dream", a song on the album Loveboat by Erasure

Stage productions
Perchance to Dream (musical), 1945 English musical by Ivor Novello

Television
"Perchance to Dream" (Batman: The Animated Series), first-season (October 19, 1992) episode of the animated TV series
"Perchance to Dream" (Twilight Zone episode), first-season (November 27, 1959) episode of the TV series
 Perchance to Dream, a Star Trek: The Next Generation novel by Howard Weinstein
"Perchance to Dean", season 4 episode 42 The Venture Bros.
"Purr-Chance to Dream", a 1967 Tom and Jerry short

See also
"Perforce to Dream", a short story in the collection Jizzle by John Wyndham